This is a list of events in Scottish television from 1954,

Events
11 January - The first weather forecast with an in-vision presenter is televised in the UK. The first weather presenter was George Cowling.
5 July - First actual news bulletin, News and Newsreel, aired on BBC One, replacing Television Newsreel.
30 July - The Television Act 1954 is given Royal Assent. It authorises the setting up of the infrastructure for British commercial television.

Births
19 October - Ken Stott, actor

See also
1953 in Scotland

References

 
Television in Scotland by year
1950s in Scottish television